Bărbulețu is a commune in Dâmbovița County, Muntenia, Romania. It is composed of three villages: Bărbulețu, Cetățuia and Gura Bărbulețului. It included seven other villages until 2004, when they were split off to form Pietrari and Râu Alb Communes.

References

Communes in Dâmbovița County
Localities in Muntenia